Lee Benson (25 August 1948, Sandy, Utah-)is a sportswriter and columnist for the Deseret News.  He has covered at least nine Olympic Games for the paper and has written columns on Mormon issues. He has also co-authored a book with James W. Parkinson about American prisoners of war of the Japanese during World War II and their attempts to obtain reparations.

Benson is the author of And They Came to Pass, a book about Brigham Young University's string of successful quarterbacks.  He co-authored In Plain Sight: The Startling Truth Behind the Elizabeth Smart investigation with Tom Smart,  and co-authored Billy Casper's 2012 autobiography, The Big Three And Me,  with Casper and James Parkinson(2012).

Benson is a 1976 graduate of Brigham Young University.  He has been sports editor of the Deseret News and as of the beginning of 2012 was a columnist for the news who wrote on metro-Salt Lake City issues.

Benson is a twin. His brother, Dee Benson was a former chief judge for the United States District Court for the State of Utah.

References

Sources 
 Highbeam entry
Deseret Book bio of Benson

Living people
American male journalists
American twins
Deseret News people
Benson family
1948 births
Brigham Young University alumni
People from Sandy, Utah